Kawerau District Council is the territorial authority for the Kawerau District of New Zealand.

The council is led by the mayor of Kawerau, who is currently . There are also eight councillors representing the district at large.

Composition

2019-2022

 Malcolm Campbell, Mayor
 Faylene Tunui, Deputy Mayor
 Carolyn Ion, Councilor
 Warwick Godfery, Councilor
 Berice Julian, Councilor
 Sela Kingi, Councilor
 Aaron Rangihika, Councilor
 Rex Savage, Councilor
 David Sparks, Councilor

References

External links

 Official website

Kawerau District
Politics of the Bay of Plenty Region
Territorial authorities of New Zealand